Eiffage S.A. is a French civil engineering construction company.   it was the third largest company of its type in France, and the fifth largest in Europe.

History
The company was formed in 1992 through the merger of several long standing companies, namely: Fougerolle (founded 1844), Quillery (founded 1863), Beugnet (founded 1871), and La Société Auxiliaire d'Entreprises Électriques et de Travaux Public, better known as SAE (founded in 1924).

Major projects
Channel Tunnel, completed in 1994 
Copenhagen Metro, completed in 2002 
Millau Viaduct, completed in 2004 
TGV Perpignan-Figueres high-speed railway line, completed in 2009
Stade Pierre-Mauroy, completed in 2012
Cestas Solar Park, completed in 2015
Conversion of Hôtel-Dieu de Lyon, completed in 2018

Eiffage is also involved in HS2 lots C2 and C3, working as part of a joint venture, due to complete in 2031.

References

External links

Eiffage.com — official website 

Construction and civil engineering companies of France
Companies based in Île-de-France
Construction and civil engineering companies established in 1992
1992 establishments in France
French companies established in 1992
Companies listed on Euronext Paris